Ard Eevin is a historic mansion in Glendale, California, U.S.. It was built in 1903 for Daniel Campbell. It was designed by architect Nathaniel Dryden. The name "Ard Eevin" means "beautiful heights" in Scottish Gaelic. It has been listed on the National Register of Historic Places since November 21, 2006.

See also
 Glendale Register of Historic Resources and Historic Districts

References

Houses on the National Register of Historic Places in California
Colonial Revival architecture in California
Houses completed in 1903
Houses in Los Angeles County, California
Buildings and structures in Glendale, California